Rytigynia caudatissima is a species of plant in the family Rubiaceae. It is endemic to Tanzania.

Sources 

Endemic flora of Tanzania
Vanguerieae
Vulnerable plants
Taxonomy articles created by Polbot